Raimondo de' Cabanni, also called Raymond of Campania (died October 1334), was a Neapolitan knight and courtier of black African origin. Through a combination of his own abilities and an advantageous marriage to one of the queen's inner circle, he rose through the ranks to hold the highest office in the royal household by the time of his death.

Origins and early life
The only information on Raimondo's origins and early life are found in the last chapter of Giovanni Boccaccio's The Fates of Illustrious Men, written around 1360. Boccaccio claims to have heard the details from two elderly Neapolitan officials, Marino Bulgaro and Costantino della Rocca, during the time he frequented the Neapolitan court as a young man between 1327 and 1341.

Boccaccio's account is consistent, where it can be checked, with what is known from contemporary documents. That Raimondo was a black African is likely, since a treaty of 1275 greatly limited the legal trade in slaves between Naples and its nearest African neighbour, the Hafsid Caliphate, by forbidding the capture or importation of Hafsid subjects as slaves, thus shifting demand to non-Hafsid (i.e. black) African slaves. Boccaccio claims that Raimondo was "an Ethiopian man who had in all respects such figure and color as have the Ethiopians who are otherwise called Moors." He was originally a slave sold by pirates to Raimondo de' Cabanni, provost of the royal kitchens. This Raimondo, recognising the boy's abilities, freed him, had him baptized, gave him his name and named him his heir in both his property and his office.

Rise at court
The earliest document to mention Raimondo is dated 6 February 1305. It records that Robert, Duke of Calabria, son of King Charles II, granted an annual pension of 20 oncie to Raimondo on the occasion of his marriage to Philippa of Catania, wet nurse of Robert's second son, Louis. (By comparison, the annual salary of a professor at the University of Naples was between 10 and 20 oncie.) The document states that the marriage took place in that year. Since the Neapolitan chancery began the year on 1 September, Raimondo's marriage must have taken place between 1 September 1304 and 6 February 1305. The marriage took place in the church of Santa Maria La Nova.

His rapid rise in the Angevin court cannot be completely retraced in the documents. Probably he owed his rise partially to his wife's influence as the governess of Robert's children. According to Boccaccio, Raimondo, being an "extremely audacious man" (vir extrema audacia), asked for and received ennoblement and knighthood on the occasion of his wedding. There is no record of this in contemporary documents.

On 25 February 1311, Robert, now king, re-confirmed the pension he had granted six years earlier and at that time Raimondo was a familiaris of the court. The earliest document that calls Raimondo a "knight" (miles) is a charter from 1325 or 1326. At that time, he was a familiaris at the court of Robert's eldest son, Charles, Duke of Calabria, whom he served as chamberlain and as the master marshal in charge of his stables. By the time of his death, Raimondo had been promoted to the office of seneschal of the royal hospice, the highest office in the royal household.

Through royal favour and connections, he acquired a palace in Naples by the Porta della Fontana in the neighbourhood of the royal Castel Nuovo. He also acquired numerous fiefs of the crown, such as Minervino, Mottola and Pantano di Foggia, as well as other fiefs from Charles of Calabria in the Terra d'Otranto. A document of 1324 shows him and his wife as co-owners with another couple of the castles of  Cercepiccola, Sassinoro, San Pietro Avellana, Rocca del Vescovo, San Giuliano and Pacile. Other properties are known from the division made by his widow and children after his death.

On 14 June 1333, Raimondo and his sons Carlo and Perrotto were compensated with 10 oncie and 24 tarì for the loss of several of their horses which had died while in the king's service.

Death and succession

Raimondo died in October 1334. He received a lavish funeral and was buried in the complex of Santa Chiara, the resting place of the Angevin kings. His monumental sepulchre is topped by his effigy in the figure of a recumbent knight in prayer. He left behind three children by Philippa:
Carlo (dead by 1340). He served as vice-seneschal of the hospice and as royal chamberlain. He married a woman of the high nobility, Margherita da Ceccano, and they had four children: Raimondello, named after his father; Antonello; Sancia; and Giovannella. At his birth in 1328, Raimondello received a "woollen cloak decorated with parrots" as a gift from the king. He was still a minor on 15 July 1345.
Perrotto (died 1336). He also served as a chamberlain. His wife was named Francesca. He was buried beside his father in the same chapel in Santa Chiara, where is sarcophagus and effigy can still be viewed.
Roberto (died 1345). He abandoned an ecclesiastical career to become count of Eboli and ultimately grand seneschal of the realm. He married Sichelgaita Filomarino and had a daughter, Caterina.

Following Raimondo's death, his widow, sons and daughter-in-law Francesca came to an agreement over several casalia he had owned, namely Lizzano, San Marzano, Roccelle and a part of Castrignano, Giuliano and the unidentified casalia of Pau et Piscarie and Tricase in the Terra d'Otranto.

Carlo and Roberto's daughters Sancia and Caterina were ladies in waiting to Queen Sancha in 1336. Sancia later became the countess of Morcone. In 1345, she was accused along with her mother and her surviving uncle of the assassination of Andrew, Duke of Calabria, the husband of Queen Joanna I. All three were arrested, tortured and imprisoned. Philippa died in prison and Roberto was executed. On 16 May 1346, a declaration (provvedimento) was issued declaring Raimondello innocent in the assassination. This rapid collapse of the fortunes of the Cabanni family following Raimondo's death was the theme of Boccaccio's account.

Notes

References

Bibliography

13th-century births
1334 deaths
Freedmen
14th-century Ethiopian people
Ethiopian people imprisoned abroad
Ethiopian Roman Catholics
People of the Kingdom of Naples
Medieval Italian knights
Burials at the Basilica of Santa Chiara
Italian courtiers
Medieval slaves
Court of Joanna I of Naples